Mayfield is an unincorporated community in Goshen Township, Washington County, Arkansas, United States. It is located at the intersection of Arkansas highways 45 and 303.

References

Unincorporated communities in Washington County, Arkansas
Unincorporated communities in Arkansas